ʿAwwām ibn Khuwaylid was an Arab Qurayshi soldier who died in the Fijar Wars. According to a Shia narration, his father Khuwaylid ibn Asad adopted Awwam in Egypt. He was a member of the Asad tribe from the Banu Quraysh and the brother of Islamic prophet Muhammad's wife Khadija bint Khuwaylid. 

Awwam was the spouse of Safiyya bint Abd al-Muttalib and they had five children:
 the companion Zubayr ibn al-Awwam, 
 Saaib ibn al-Awwām 
 Hind bint al-Awwam, spouse of Zayd ibn Haritha al-Kalbi, the adoptive son of Muhammad
 Abdulkaaba ibn al-Awwam.
 Zaynab bint al-Awwam, spouse of her cousin, Hakim ibn Hizam ibn Khuwaylid

See also

Sahaba
List of notable Hijazis
Zubayrids

References

External links
http://al-islam.org/beacons/7.htm

7th-century Arabs
Banu Asad (Quraysh)